The Last Day of Summer is a 1958 romantic drama film directed by the Polish film director Tadeusz Konwicki.

Plot

The action takes place amid the deserted dunes and screaming gulls of a chilly Baltic shore. Two lonely, damaged people, played by Irena Laskowska and Jan Machulski, whose characters remain nameless throughout the film, happen to meet on a deserted beach. Both are haunted by vivid memories of World War II and make silent, imperfect attempts to reach out to each other, but they cannot find a means to communicate.

See also
 Cinema of Poland
 List of Polish language films

External links
 
 

1958 films
Polish black-and-white films
1950s Polish-language films
1958 romantic drama films
Polish romantic drama films